The House of Palatinate-Simmern was a German-Bavarian cadet branch of the House of Wittelsbach. The house was one of the collateral lineages of the Palatinate. It became the main branch in 1559.

The Palatinate line of the House of Wittelsbach was divided into four lines after the death of Rupert III in 1410, including the line of Palatinate-Simmern with its capital in Simmern. This line became extinct in 1685 with the death of Charles II. The House of Palatinate-Neuburg line inherited the Electorate.

The founder of the line Simmern, Stephen, Count Palatine of Simmern-Zweibrücken is also the founder of the cadet branch House of Palatinate-Zweibrücken and its cadet branches. The rights over the County of Veldenz and a share of the County of Sponheim, transmitted by Stephen's wife Anna of Veldenz, were held by these lineages.

, those in the line of succession to the British throne are Protestant descendants of Sophia, who was born into the house (daughter of Frederick V and Elizabeth Stuart) as Princess palatine of the Rhine, later becoming Electress consort of Hanover

Counts Palatine of Simmern

 Stefan 1410–1444
 Frederick I 1444–1480
 John I 1480–1509
 John II 1509–1557
 following Frederick, as II 1557–became Elector

Electors of the Palatinate
 Frederick III 1559–1576
 Louis VI 1576–1583
 Frederick IV 1583–1610
 Frederick V 1610–1623
 Charles I Louis 1649–1680
 Charles II 1680–1685

See also
 Palatinate (disambiguation)

References

 
British monarchy

German noble families
Palatinate-Simmern
History of the Palatinate (region)
Former states and territories of Rhineland-Palatinate